Transforming growth factor alpha (TGF-α) is a protein that in humans is encoded by the TGFA gene. As a member of the epidermal growth factor (EGF) family, TGF-α is a mitogenic polypeptide. The protein becomes activated when binding to receptors capable of protein kinase activity for cellular signaling.

TGF-α is a transforming growth factor that is a ligand for the epidermal growth factor receptor, which activates a signaling pathway for cell proliferation, differentiation and development. This protein may act as either a transmembrane-bound ligand or a soluble ligand. This gene has been associated with many types of cancers, and it may also be involved in some cases of cleft lip/palate.

Synthesis
TGF-α is synthesized internally as part of a 160 (human) or 159 (rat) amino acid transmembrane precursor. The precursor is composed of an extracellular domain containing a hydrophobic transmembrane domain, 50 amino acids of TGF-α, and a 35-residue-long cytoplasmic domain. In its smallest form, TGF-α has six cysteines linked together via three disulfide bridges.  Collectively, all members of the EGF/TGF-α family share this structure.  The protein, however, is not directly related to TGF-β. 

Limited success has resulted from attempts to synthesize of a reductant molecule to TGF-α that displays a similar biological profile.

Synthesis in the stomach
In the stomach, TGF-α is manufactured within the normal gastric mucosa. TGF-α has been shown to inhibit gastric acid secretion.

Function 
TGF-α can be produced in macrophages, brain cells, and keratinocytes.  TGF-α induces epithelial development.  Considering that TGF-α is a member of the EGF family, the biological actions of TGF-α and EGF are similar.  For instance, TGF-α and EGF bind to the same receptor.  When TGF-α binds to EGFR it can initiate multiple cell proliferation events. Cell proliferation events that involve TGF-α bound to EGFR include wound healing and embryogenesis.  TGF-α is also involved in tumerogenesis and believed to promote angiogenesis.

TGF-α has also been shown to stimulate neural cell proliferation in the adult injured brain.

Receptor
A 170-kDa glycosylated protein known as the EGF receptor binds to TGF-α allowing the polypeptide to function in various signaling pathways. The EGF receptor is characterized by having an extracellular domain that has numerous amino acid motifs. EGFR is essential for a single transmembrane domain, an intracellular domain (containing tyrosine kinase activity), and ligand recognition. As a membrane anchored-growth factor, TGF-α can be cleaved from an integral membrane glycoprotein via a protease.  Soluble forms of TGF-α resulting from the cleavage have the capacity to activate EGFR. EGFR can be activated from a membrane-anchored growth factor as well.

When TGF-α binds to EGFR it dimerizes triggering phosphorylation of a protein-tyrosine kinase.  The activity of protein-tyrosine kinase causes an autophosphorylation to occur among several tyrosine residues within EGFR, influencing activation and signaling of other proteins that interact in many signal transduction pathways.

Animal studies 

In an animal model of Parkinson's disease where dopaminergic neurons have been damaged by 6-hydroxydopamine, infusion of TGF-α into the brain caused an increase in the number of neuronal precursor cells. However TGF-α treatment did not result in neurogenesis of dopaminergic neurons.

Human studies

Neuroendocrine system
The EGF/TGF-α family has been shown to regulate luteinizing hormone-releasing hormone (LHRH) through a glial-neuronal interactive process.  Produced in hypothalamic astrocytes, TGF-α indirectly stimulates LHRH release through various intermediates.  As a result, TGF-α is a physiological component essential to the initiation process of female puberty.

Suprachiasmatic nucleus
TGF-α has also been observed to be highly expressed in the suprachiasmatic nucleus (SCN) (5).  This finding suggests a role for EGFR signaling in the regulation of CLOCK and circadian rhythms within the SCN.  Similar studies have shown that when injected into the third ventricle TGF-α can suppress circadian locomotor behavior along with drinking or eating activities.

Tumors
This protein shows potential use as a prognostic biomarker in various tumors, like gastric carcinoma. or melanoma has been suggested. Elevated TGF-α is associated with Menetrier's disease, a precancerous condition of the stomach.

Interactions 

TGF alpha has been shown to interact with GORASP1 and GORASP2.

See also 
 Transforming growth factor

References

Further reading

External links